Smoked glass is glass held in the smoke of a candle flame (or other inefficiently burning hydrocarbon) such that one surface of the sheet of glass is covered in a layer of smoke residue. The glass is used as a medium for recording pen traces in scientific instruments, and is also used to track pheromone deposition in ants

The advantages of using the glass are that the recording medium is easily renewable (just re-smoke the glass), and that the trace obtained can easily be magnified by projection onto a suitable surface. A variation on this scheme is the use of smoked paper in early seismographs.

The effect of smoked glass can be incorporated into glass manufacture by adding darkening materials, such that light passing through the glass is decreased in brightness. It can be used aesthetically, for example, in the manufacture of coffee tables with smoked glass tops. It can also be used in scientific instruments as a filter, as in the use of smoked glass in cross-staves and sextants, allowing operators to make sun sightings without damaging their eyesight.

See also 

 Window film

References 

Glass coating and surface modification
Smoke